The Miss Wool of America Pageant was a showcase of wool-related merchandise. It was an annual event organized by the National Wool Growers Association (U.S.), American Sheep Producers Council, and the Wool Bureau, Inc. at San Angelo, Texas, from 1952 to 1972. Originally a Texas-only event (the Miss Wool of Texas Pageant), it attracted wider entrants from 1958 and evolved into a national pageant.  The winner would tour nationally wearing the latest in woolen fashion to promote the industry.

History 
The event was originally known as the Miss Wool of Texas Pageant and first began in 1952.  The purpose of the event was primarily to celebrate a thriving sheep and wool industry of San Angelo, Texas.  A young lady would be chosen to represent the wool industry in Texas as "Miss Wool" for a year. From 1958, contestants from various wool-producing regions of the United States competed.  The event evolved into the Miss Wool of America Pageant with Miss Wools from various states competing for the national title.

Miss Wool 
Miss Wool would go on tour dressed in the latest woolen fashions, representing the industry on a national level. Eighteen-year-old Cheri Slikker, in 1963, was the youngest winner of the title. 

The American Sheep Producers Council, National Wool Growers Association, and the Wool Bureau were the sponsors. They funded a televised version of the competition in its later years which included the appearance of movie stars and popular musicians. The 1968 Miss Wool Pageant was broadcast live on color television. The hosts for the program were Jane Morgan and Donald O'Connor.  In 1970, Nancy Ames and singer Jack Jones hosted the pageant.

Pageant winners 
The first Miss Wool winner was Kathryn Gromatski in 1952. Winners of titles since then have included:

 1957, Earline Whitt
1958, Miriam LaCour
1959, Carrell Currie
1960, Patti Jo Shaw
1963, Cheri Slikker
1964, Suzy Beck
1965, Sharone Moline
1966, Elizabeth Peteel
1968, Allana Crimmins
1970, Gail "Gus" Heinzmann
1971, Carey Andersen
1972, Barbara Ward

See also 

 New York State Sheep and Wool Festival

References 

Wool industry